The following Confederate Army units and commanders fought in the Battle of Five Forks of the American Civil War. The Union order of battle is listed separately.

Abbreviations used

Military rank
 MG = Major General
 BG = Brigadier General
 Col = Colonel
 Ltc = Lieutenant Colonel
 Maj = Major
 Cpt = Captain

Other
 w = wounded
 mw = mortally wounded

Confederate Army
MG George Pickett, Commanding

Cavalry Corps

MG Fitzhugh Lee

See also

 Virginia in the American Civil War

Notes

References
 Eicher, John H., and Eicher, David J., Civil War High Commands, Stanford University Press, 2001, .

American Civil War orders of battle